Nando (born December 5, 1985) is a football player. He is a midfielder for the Timor-Leste national football team.

External links

References

1985 births
Living people
East Timorese footballers
Association football midfielders
Timor-Leste international footballers
A.D. Dili Leste players